Plakhino is the name of several rural localities in Russia:
Plakhino, Zakharovsky District of Ryazan Oblast, a selo Zakharovsky District of Ryazan Oblast
Plakhino, Kholmogorsky District, Arkhangelsk Oblast, a village in Khavrogorskoye Rural Settlement of Kholmogorsky District, Arkhangelsk Oblast